Ibex Mountain is a young cinder cone in the Yukon Territory, Canada, located 33 km southwest of Whitehorse and 12 km southeast of Mount Arkell. It is in a group of basaltic cones and lava flows called Alligator Lake and is in the Northern Cordilleran Volcanic Province. It is believed Ibex Mountain last erupted during the Pleistocene. Ibex Mountain is at the head of the Ibex River, which is southeast of Whitehorse. There is a road that runs close to Ibex Lake on the southeast side of the summit. From there is the hike to the summit of the cone.

See also
 List of Northern Cordilleran volcanoes
 List of volcanoes in Canada
 Volcanism of Canada

References

Volcanoes of Yukon
Cinder cones of Canada
Northern Cordilleran Volcanic Province
Boundary Ranges
Two-thousanders of Yukon